Helge Lund (born 16 October 1962) is a Norwegian businessman who has been chairman of BP since January 2019, and chairman of the Danish healthcare company Novo Nordisk since 2018. He is the former chief executive officer (CEO) of BG Group, Statoil and Aker Kværner, and was a director of Schlumberger from June 2016 to April 2018.

Early life
Lund was born in Oslo, Norway, in 1962. He graduated in business management at the Norwegian School of Economics in Bergen. He has a Master of Business Administration (MBA) from the INSEAD business school in France.

Career
He started his career as a management consultant for McKinsey & Company and as political adviser for the Conservative Party in the Norwegian parliament Stortinget, before starting work for Hafslund Nycomed in 1993. In 1997-8 he was vice president in Nycomed Pharma before starting work in Aker RGI in 1999 as vice president before becoming CEO for Aker Kværner in 2002. After Olav Fjell withdrew as CEO of Statoil in 2004, Lund took over and was retained after Statoil merged with the oil & gas division of Norsk Hydro in 2007 to create StatoilHydro.

On 15 October 2014, Lund resigned as CEO for Statoil with immediate effect, to join the management team of the UK's BG Group as CEO from 9 February 2015.

On 1 December 2014, in response to pressure from shareholders, BG Group reduced a £12 million share award golden hello for Lund to between £4.7 million to £10.6 million, depending on the company's future performance. His basic salary will be £1.5 million, but with bonuses, total compensation could reach £14 million per annum.

Following the takeover of BG Group by Royal Dutch Shell, Lund was out of a job, but did receive a total of £5.5 million for his 11 months work, and £9.7 million in shares in February 2016, as a result of the takeover.

In June 2016, Lund was appointed to the board of directors of Schlumberger. On 26 April 2018, it was announced by BP that he would join their board on the 1 September 2018 and succeed Carl-Henric Svanberg as chairman with effect from 1 January 2019.

Personal life
He is married to Else-Cathrine Lund.

References

Norwegian School of Economics alumni
People in the petroleum industry
INSEAD alumni
1962 births
Living people
Equinor people
Norwegian businesspeople in the oil industry
McKinsey & Company people
BP people
Chairmen of BP